Koninklijke Wegener NV was a Dutch publisher of newspapers. It was the largest publisher of daily regional newspapers, free local newspapers and special interest magazines in the Netherlands. It also sold internet products and graphical products. The company ceased to exist when it was acquired by Belgian media company De Persgroep in 2015.

History
The origin of Wegener can be found in November 1903. Johan Frederik Wegener began in Apeldoorn with a news and magazine advertising business. Wegener started a newspaper that would later become the Apeldoornse Courant. The Wegener corporation as it exists today came from fusions and takeovers. In August 1999, VNU, another Dutch publisher, sold all its newspapers (BN/DeStem, Brabants Dagblad, Eindhovens Dagblad and De Gelderlander) to Wegener. This strongly enforced the position of Wegener on the Dutch media market.

Since 6 February 2007 all Wegener newspapers are in tabloid format.
It is the "largest publisher of regional newspapers and door-to-door papers in the Netherlands".

Companies
Wegener consisted of about 40 businesses, both in the Netherlands as in some other European countries.

De Gelderlander
De Stentor
Brabants Dagblad
BN/De Stem / PZC
De Twentsche Courant Tubantia
Eindhovens Dagblad
Wegener Huis-aan-huisMedia
Wegener Multimedia
Wegener DM
Wegener Grafische Groep
Wegener Golf
JobTrack
AutoTrack
Funda N.V.

Wegener used to own AD Nieuwsmedia (the company that publishes Algemeen Dagblad and four regional newspapers by Wegener)together with PCM, another Dutch publisher, from 2005 to 2009. This publisher encompassed twenty regional editions of the Algemeen Dagblad newspaper. In 2009 Wegener sold AD Nieuwsmedia to PCM.

Shareholders
Wegener was taken over by the British Mecom corporation on 18 May 2008 for the sum of 800 million euros. Mecom used to own 86.4% of the company. Mecom eventually sold its shares to De Persgroep in 2015 for 245 million euros.

References

Apeldoorn
Companies based in Gelderland
Companies formerly listed on Euronext Amsterdam
Publishing companies established in 1988